Mark Okerstrom (born 1972/1973) is a Canadian lawyer and technology executive in the hospitality sector. He was the president and CEO of Expedia Group until December 4, 2019. Mark is currently the president and COO of Convoy.

Early life and education
Okerstrom was born in Vancouver, British Columbia, and is the son of two school teachers.

Okerstrom earned a certificate of liberal arts from Simon Fraser University in 1995, a Juris Doctor from the University of British Columbia in 1998, and a Master of Business Administration from Harvard Business School in 2004.

Career
In his early career, Okerstrom was an associate at the law firms Fasken Martineau and Freshfields Bruckhaus Deringer from 1998 to 2002. In 2003, he became an associate at investment bank UBS in London. Okerstrom later became a consultant at Bain & Company in Boston and San Francisco from 2004 to 2006, handling mergers and acquisitions.
Okerstrom was recruited to join Expedia Inc. in 2006 as head of Expedia's corporate development and strategy group. He later served as senior director of operations, executive vice president of operations, and then became Expedia's chief financial officer in 2011. During his tenure, the company doubled its annual revenue from 2012 to almost $8.8 billion in 2016. Okerstrom served as the main negotiator in the company's investment stake in Trivago, and led the company's acquisitions of Travelocity and Wotif.

In August 2017, Okerstrom became CEO of Expedia, succeeding Dara Khosrowshahi. He also served on the board of directors. Okerstrom led the rebrand of Expedia, Inc. to Expedia Group in 2018.

According to the New York Times, Okerstrom was 23rd on the list of the highest paid CEOs of companies with revenues of at least $1 billion for 2017.

On December 4, 2019, Okerstrom and his CFO Alan Pickerill resigned from their respective roles at Expedia Group due to a difference of opinion on strategic alignment with the board.

On August 27, 2020, Mark joined Seattle-based digital freight startup Convoy as President, COO.

Personal life
Okerstrom is married and has two daughters.

References

Expedia Group
1970s births
Living people
20th-century Canadian lawyers
21st-century Canadian businesspeople
21st-century Canadian lawyers
Bain & Company employees
Businesspeople from Vancouver
Businesspeople in the hospitality industry
Canadian expatriates in the United States
Canadian expatriates in the United Kingdom
Canadian technology chief executives
Chief financial officers
Harvard Business School alumni
Simon Fraser University alumni
UBS people
University of British Columbia alumni
Year of birth missing (living people)